The Samson River (in French: rivière Samson) is a tributary of the east bank of the Chaudière River, which flows northward to empty on the south bank of the St. Lawrence River, in Quebec, in Canada.

Toponymy 
The river was named "Toulidesihontes" in 1759 on John Montresor's map. On the 1884 Alfred Richard Cecil Selwyn of 1884, an Indian trail linked the Chaudière River, facing the Drolet River, eastward to the Samson River following a small valley, a few hundred meters to the north, parallel to the Route de l'Eglise in Audet, then rang 7 passing north of Mont Dostie towards the sources of the Samson River.
The toponym "Samson" appears on various survey plans from the end of the 19th century. The term "Samson" is a family name of French origin. The toponym Samson River was formalized on December 5, 1968, at the Commission de toponymie du Québec.

See also 
 List of rivers of Quebec

References 

Rivers of Estrie
Le Granit Regional County Municipality
Rivers of Chaudière-Appalaches
Beauce-Sartigan Regional County Municipality